Ayatollah Mohammad Reza Modarresi-Yazdi (born 1955 in Yazd) is one of the 12 members of the Guardian Council of the Islamic Republic of Iran  and also a member of the Assembly of Experts.

See also
 List of Ayatollahs

References 

Iranian ayatollahs
Iranian individuals subject to the U.S. Department of the Treasury sanctions
Iranian Islamists
Shia Islamists
Living people
Members of the Guardian Council
Society of Seminary Teachers of Qom members
1955 births
Shia Muslims
People from Yazd